Calvin Memorial Presbyterian Church, located at 3105 North 24th Street, was formed in 1954 as an integrated congregation in North Omaha, Nebraska. Originally called the North Presbyterian Church, the City of Omaha has reported, "Calvin Memorial Presbyterian Church is architecturally significant to Omaha as a fine example of the Neo-Classical Revival Style of architecture." It was designated a City of Omaha landmark in 1985; it was listed on the National Register of Historic Places as North Presbyterian Church in 1986.

About
Inspired by several buildings of the 1898 Trans-Mississippi and International Exposition held nearby in Kountze Place, the North Presbyterian Church was built in 1910. F. A. Henninger, an influential Omaha architect, designed the building to serve what was then an affluent suburb of Omaha.

Calvin Memorial Presbyterian Church was founded by Rev. Charles E. Tyler, also responsible for founding Hillside Presbyterian church in Omaha.

See also
History of North Omaha, Nebraska
Architecture of North Omaha, Nebraska
Black church
 List of churches in Omaha, Nebraska

External links
"A History of North Omaha's Calvin Memorial Presbyterian Church" by Adam Fletcher Sasse for NorthOmahaHistory.com

References

Churches completed in 1910
Landmarks in North Omaha, Nebraska
Churches in Omaha, Nebraska
African-American history in Omaha, Nebraska
National Register of Historic Places in Omaha, Nebraska
Churches on the National Register of Historic Places in Nebraska
Presbyterian churches in Nebraska
Omaha Landmarks